Francis Labrosse (born April 16, 1979) is a Seychellois judoka.

Achievements

References
 

1979 births
Living people
Seychellois male judoka
Judoka at the 2000 Summer Olympics
Judoka at the 2004 Summer Olympics
Olympic judoka of Seychelles
Place of birth missing (living people)
21st-century Seychellois people